The 1992 United States presidential election in Alaska took place on November 3, 1992, as part of the 1992 United States presidential election. Voters chose three representatives, or electors to the Electoral College, who voted for president and vice president.

Alaska was won by incumbent President George H. W. Bush (R-Texas) with 39.4% of the popular vote over Governor Bill Clinton (D-Arkansas) with 30.2%. Bush won Alaska by a margin of 9.2%. Businessman Ross Perot (I-Texas) finished in third, with 28.4% of the popular vote. Clinton ultimately won the national vote, defeating incumbent President Bush. Alaska has only voted Democratic once, and that was in 1964 for Lyndon B. Johnson. As of 2020, this is the only time the Republican margin of victory in Alaska has been in single digits since 1968, and the most recent time that the state was won with a plurality. 

With 28.43% of the popular vote, Alaska would prove to be Perot's second strongest state after Maine. Alaska was also one of seven states to give a county to Perot, the others being California, Colorado, Kansas, Maine, Nevada and Texas. Alaska awarded Perot Denali Borough, making it the last time it did not vote for the Republican candidate.

Results

See also
United States presidential elections in Alaska

References

1992 Alaska elections
Alaska
1992